The Zyoba are an ethnic and linguistic group based near Lake Tanganyika in Tanzania and the Democratic Republic of the Congo who speak the Joba language.

See also
 List of ethnic groups in Tanzania

References

Ethnic groups in the Democratic Republic of the Congo
Ethnic groups in Tanzania